Eremocaulon is a genus of Brazilian bamboo in the grass family.

Species
 Eremocaulon amazonicum Londoño - Acre, Amazonas, Rondônia
 Eremocaulon asymmetricum (Soderstr. & Londoño) Londoño - Bahia
 Eremocaulon aureofimbriatum Soderstr. & Londoño - Bahia, Minas Gerais
 Eremocaulon capitatum (Trin.) Londoño  - Goiás, Mato Grosso, Mato Grosso do Sul

Formerly included
see Aulonemia 
Eremocaulon setosum - Aulonemia setosa

References

Bambusoideae genera
Endemic flora of Brazil
Grasses of Brazil
Flora of Bahia
Flora of Goiás
Flora of Minas Gerais
Flora of Rondônia
Flora of the Amazon
Bambusoideae